The McLemore House is a property in Franklin, Tennessee that was listed on the National Register of Historic Places in 1999.

It is also known as the Harvey McLemore House, as it was the home of former slave Harvey McLemore, who became a successful farmer. It has also been known as the House and Estate of Maggie Matthews.

History 
The house dates from 1880 and it includes Colonial Revival architecture. For five (or seven) generations, from 1880 to 1997, it was owned by the same family.

Harvey McLemore was sold as "a slave for life" in 1859 to William S. McLemore, who was then the county clerk, and who later became a judge. He was previously owned by Bethenia J. McLemore, the mother of William.  In 1880, Harvey McLemore purchased four lots from Judge William S. McLemore, and built his house as one of the first residences in the subdivision. Harvey was just the third African-American to purchase property in Hard Bargain.

To-day 
In 1998 the house was under renovation for use as a museum. It is now a museum, the McLemore House African-American Museum or the McLemore House Museum.

References

Houses on the National Register of Historic Places in Tennessee
Colonial Revival architecture in Tennessee
Houses completed in 1880
Museums in Williamson County, Tennessee
African-American museums in Tennessee
Historic house museums in Tennessee
Houses in Franklin, Tennessee
National Register of Historic Places in Williamson County, Tennessee